Peter Belli (born Georg Peter Brandt; 19 June 1943 in Kiel) is a Danish singer and actor.

Career 
Peter's debut as a singer was in 1959, for a band called Trefters. In the 1960s, Belli became Denmark's first rock star, alongside his band, Les Rivals, warming up for such greats as The Rolling Stones and The Beatles.

In the 1970s, Belli transitioned to doing more dansktop, having several hits such as Bliv væk fra vort kvarter and Ingen regning. In the same period, he started acting in a number of Danish movies.

In 1981 he had a hit with "Hvis det er sandt" from his same year album "Er det sådan?". It was a Danish version of Billy Joel's You May Be Right.

It wasn't until the late 1980s that Belli returned to his rock roots, having great success with his Yeah album.

Discography 

Peter Belli has published a grand total of 43 records in his career:

 Peter Belli, 1967
 Ob-la-di, ob-la-da, 1968
 Peter Belli, 1971
 Peter Belli & Søn, 1974
 Peter Belli's største succes'er, 1974
 Det bli'r aldrig som det var i..., 1975
 Peter Belli & Ulvene Live, 1976
 Nu er det blevet hårde tider, 1977
 Sådan er mit liv, 1977
 Jeg lever for musik, 1978
 Sådan som du er, 1979
 Peter Belli's 20 års jubilæum, 1980
 Peter Belli's bedste 1965–1970, 1980
 Er det sådan?, 1981
 Kære gamle tog, 1981
 Fræk og følsom, 1981
 Belli's allerbedste, 1981
 Tænk hvad jeg ser, 1982
 Sort på hvidt, 1983
 Jeg er som jeg er, 1984
 Roll over Beatles (med Les Rivals), 1987
 Ta' det med et smil, 1987
 Yeah, 1991
 Ribbet og flået, 1992
 Ulven Peter de 34 største hits, 1993
 Rock and Roll Live, 1994
 Talisman, 1997
 Helt igennem respektabel – Peter Belli 1959 – 1999, 1999
 The Collection, 2000
 Ny dag på vej, 2001
 Peter Belli synger julens sange, 2001
 The Beat years 1964 – 1968, 2002
 Ulven Peter, 2002
 Got Masters if you want it, 2003
 Hit House Reunion, 2003
 Konger for en aften, 2003
 Når timerne bli'r små, 2004
 Sange fra Blomstersengen, 2005
 Peter Belli – Den Store Peter Belli Boks – De Første 25 År 1964–1989, 2006
 Rock n Soul Music: The Memphis Album, 2007
 Rejsende I Rock'n´roll, 2009
 Underværker, 2011
 Evig Og Altid, 2013

Filmography 
In the span of his career, Belli has acted and voice-acted in a number of Danish movies:

 Thomas er fredløs, 1967
 Den dobbelte mand, 1976
 Pelle Haleløs, 1981 (voice)
 Høfeber, 1991
 The Lion King, 1994 (Danish dub; voice of Rafiki)
 The Lion King 2, 1998 (Danish dub; voice of Rafiki)
 Et rigtigt menneske, 2001
 Flyvende farmor, 2001
 Tid til forandring, 2004
 Bølle Bob og Smukke Sally, 2005
 Koko-di Koko-da, 2019

Bibliography 

In 2011, Peter Belli published a self-biography titled Et enestående liv.

References

External links 
 
 
 

Danish rock musicians
Living people
1943 births
German emigrants to Denmark